Arthur Henry Brind  (4 July 1927 – 3 November 2020) was a British diplomat.

Career
Brind was educated at St John's College, Cambridge and joined the Colonial Service in 1950, serving in the Gold Coast (later Ghana) until 1960.

He then transferred to HM Diplomatic Service. Brind was Ambassador to Somalia (1977–1980); Visiting Research Fellow at Chatham House (1981–1982); and finally High Commissioner to Malawi (1983–1987).

He died on 3 November 2020.

Honours
  Companion of the Order of St Michael and St George (CMG) - 1973

References

1927 births
2020 deaths
Members of HM Diplomatic Service
Alumni of St John's College, Cambridge
Companions of the Order of St Michael and St George
Ambassadors of the United Kingdom to Somalia
High Commissioners of the United Kingdom to Malawi
Colonial Service officers